Belén is a village in the Salto Department of northwestern Uruguay.

Belén is also the name of the municipality to which the village belongs.

Geography
The village is located on the mouth of the stream Arroyo Yacuy, on the banks of Uruguay River, northwest of Arapey and north of Salto.

History
It was first established as "Pueblo" (village) on 12 January 1860 and then re-established on 7 May 1862 by the Act of Ley Nº 705 and again on 2 October 1867 by the Act of Ley Nº 896.

Population
In 2011, Belén had a population of 1,926.

 
Source: Instituto Nacional de Estadística de Uruguay

References

External links
INE map of Belén and Chacras de Belén

Populated places in the Salto Department
1862 establishments in Uruguay